The 1901 Stretford by-election was held on 26 February 1901 after the death of the incumbent Conservative MP, Sir John Maclure.  It was retained by the Conservative candidate Charles Cripps.

References

1901 elections in the United Kingdom
1901 in England
1900s in Lancashire
Elections in Trafford
By-elections to the Parliament of the United Kingdom in Lancashire constituencies
By-elections to the Parliament of the United Kingdom in Greater Manchester constituencies